The London Midland and Scottish Railway (LMS) Rebuilt Jubilee Class consisted of two 4-6-0 steam locomotives.

History
Both were rebuilt in 1942 from the LMS Jubilee Class engines—5736 Phoenix in April 1942 and 5735 Comet a month later. They were the second and third examples of the LMS 2A boilered 4-6-0 locomotives, following on from the 1935 pioneer rebuild 6170 British Legion. Both Jubilees had been built in 1936 at Crewe, and therefore their original type 3A boilers were not life expired and hence were refurbished and reused on different engines rather than being scrapped. They were given the power classification 6P.

From 1943 it was decided not to repeat the conversion on the remaining 189 members of the Jubilee Class. Rather it was decided to rebuild members of the LMS Royal Scot Class into the LMS Rebuilt Royal Scot Class.

BR Service
Both were inherited by British Railways in 1948 in and BR added 40000 to their numbers so that they became 45735/6. 45736 Phoenix was withdrawn in September 1964 and 45735 Comet followed in October. Neither was preserved.

External links 
 Jubilees page for (4)5735 Comet
 Jubilees page for (4)5736 Phoenix

 rebuilds
7 Jubilee
Standard gauge steam locomotives of Great Britain
Scrapped locomotives
Rebuilt locomotives